Ľubochňa is a village and municipality in Ružomberok District in the Žilina Region of northern Slovakia.

History
In historical records the village was first mentioned in 1818.

Geography
The municipality lies at an altitude of 451 metres and covers an area of 113.679 km². It has a population of about 1042 people.

External links
http://www.statistics.sk/mosmis/eng/run.html
http://www.lubochna.sk/

Villages and municipalities in Ružomberok District